Princess Joyce Enaje Pring-Triviño (born May 4, 1993) is a Filipina television personality and host. Born in Tondo, Manila, she began hosting as a video jockey after winning at Myx VJ Search in 2011. Pring became a Sparkle artist for her hosting in the online show of 2018 GMA New Year Countdown: Buong Puso Para sa Kapuso (2017–2018) and various television shows.

Early life
Princess Joyce Enaje Pring was born on May 4, 1993, in Tondo, Manila, to Joe (a Manila cop) and Catherine Enaje Pring (a registered nurse). She grew up in Tondo and Sta. Mesa, Manila. Joe was assassinated by members of the Alex Boncayao Brigade when Pring was just over a year old. She was raised by Catherine Enaje and Chandro Uttamchandani, her stepfather and graphic artist. Pring has her brother, Victor. She was a graduate of Quezon City Science High School and enrolled in University of the Philippines Diliman College of Fine Arts in 2010.

Career
Pring became a finalist in Myx VJ Search in 2011, where she won as a video jockey. In 2014, she hosted the Trip Na Trip segment of the noontime show Eat Bulaga!, before signing a contract with Sparkle three years later. As the agency's artist, Pring first hosted in the online show of 2018 GMA New Year Countdown: Buong Puso Para sa Kapuso (at the SM Mall of Asia) in December. She subsequently co-hosted in various television shows, such as the first season of The Clash and Unang Hirit.

Personal life
Pring and actor Juancho Triviño are in a relationship since May 2019. They became engaged that August, and married in Pasay City in February 2020. She gave birth to their son, Alonso Eliam, on July 2, 2021. Their second child was announced in November 2022.

Discography

Singles
2014 - "Tulala"
2019 - "Baka Sakali" (with Rico Blanco)
2020 - "Alone Together"

Filmography

Television

Radio

Web shows

Podcast series

Audiobook

Notes

References

External links
 
 

1993 births
Living people
Filipino radio personalities
Filipino television personalities
VJs (media personalities)
Filipino podcasters
People from Tondo, Manila
People from Santa Mesa
GMA Network personalities
GMA Integrated News and Public Affairs people